Giorgi Nikuradze (born 1 October 1979 in Tbilisi) is a retired Georgian professional football player.

1979 births
Living people
Footballers from Georgia (country)
Expatriate footballers from Georgia (country)
Expatriate footballers in Finland
Veikkausliiga players
Georgia (country) international footballers
FC Guria Lanchkhuti players
FC Jokerit players
TP-47 players
Association football goalkeepers